The Montana Free Press (MTFP) is an American non-profit news organization based in Helena, Montana. As an investigative journalism organization, it focuses on uncovering non-transparent bureaucratic processes and institutions.

History
The Montana Free Press was founded in 2016  by journalist John S. Adams, who had previously worked as the capital bureau chief for The Great Falls Tribune in 2015. Prior to both, Adams was a staff reporter at the Missoula Independent. 

In 2018, Montana Free Press founder Adams was featured in the documentary film Dark Money, which premiered at the 2018 Sundance Film Festival. The film uncovered the influences of undisclosed corporate "dark money" on elections, while delving deep into investigative topics such as how the funding from  American Tradition Partnership influenced Montana state and federal election laws.

Coverage
The Montana Free Press focuses on the government and policy of the State of Montana, as well as on issues relating to the economy, environment, energy, health care, and social justice. Investigative news from Montana Free Press includes articles on solitary confinement in Montana state prisons, lobbying from right to work organizations, state budget cuts' effects on rural areas of Montana, water supply in Fort Peck Indian Reservation, among other topics.

See also
 Wisconsin Center for Investigative Journalism
 Center for Public Integrity
 The Colorado Independent
 Honolulu Civil Beat
 Madison365
 The Marshall Project
 Jon Ralston

References

External links
 
 Montana Free Press profile at the Institute for Nonprofit News

American journalism organizations
Investigative journalism
American news websites
Non-profit organizations based in Montana
2016 establishments in Montana
Organizations established in 2016